The list of ship decommissionings in 1992 includes a chronological list of all ships decommissioned in 1992.


See also 

1992
 Ship decommissionings
Ship